Luciano Frosini (27 December 1927 – 16 June 2017) was an Italian racing cyclist. He won stage 16 of the 1951 Giro d'Italia.

References

External links
 

1927 births
2017 deaths
Italian male cyclists
Italian Giro d'Italia stage winners
Cyclists from Tuscany
People from Pontedera
Sportspeople from the Province of Pisa